Sacha Yevgeny Golob (born 19 October 1981) is a British philosopher and a Reader in the Department of Philosophy at King's College London. Golob is known for his expertise on French and German philosophy, in particular the work of Immanuel Kant and Martin Heidegger.

Career
He is the current Co-Editor with Alix Cohen of the British Journal for the History of Philosophy and the Founder of the Centre for Philosophy and Art.
Previously, he was a Research Fellow at Peterhouse, Cambridge.

Books
 Heidegger on Concepts, Freedom, and Normativity, Cambridge University Press, 2014
 The Cambridge History of Moral Philosophy, co-editor with Jens Timmermann, Cambridge University Press, 2017

References

External links
Personal Website
Sacha Golob at KCL

1981 births
21st-century British educators
21st-century British historians
21st-century British male writers
21st-century British philosophers
21st-century essayists
Academics of King's College London
Alumni of the University of Cambridge
Alumni of the University of Oxford
British educators
British essayists
British ethicists
British historians
British male non-fiction writers
British philosophers
Continental philosophers
Fellows of Peterhouse, Cambridge
Foucault scholars
Heidegger scholars
Historians of philosophy
Kant scholars
Living people
Philosophers of art
Philosophers of culture
Philosophers of history
Philosophers of mind
Philosophy writers
Philosophy journal editors